Segheneyti Subregion is a subregion in the Debub (Southern) region (Zoba Debub) of Eritrea. Its capital lies at Segheneyti.

References
Awate.com: Martyr Statistics

Southern Region (Eritrea)
Subregions of Eritrea